Methoxymethylenetriphenylphosphine is a Wittig reagent used for the homologization of aldehydes, and ketones to extended aldehydes, a organic reaction first reported in 1958. The reagent is generally prepared and used in situ. It has blood-red color, indicative of destabilized ylides.

Preparation
The reagent can be prepared in two steps from triphenylphosphine. The first step is P-alkylation with chloromethyl methyl ether.  
 
In the second step, the resulting phosphonium salt is deprotonated.

In place of chloromethyl methyl ether, a mixture of methylal and acetyl chloride can be used.

Uses
This reagent reacts with a ketone or aldehyde in a Wittig reaction to give an enol ether, which can be converted to the aldehyde by acid-induced hydrolysis.

The initial report of the reaction demonstrated its use on the steroid tigogenone.

It was later used in the Wender Taxol total synthesis and the Stork quinine total synthesis.

References
  A new aldehyde synthesis Samuel G. Levine J. Am. Chem. Soc.; 1958; 80(22); 6150–6151. doi:10.1021/ja01555a068

Homologation reactions
Organophosphanes